Giwaipani or Gewaipani (Village ID 52056) is a hill station (village) in Almora district in the Indian state of Uttarakhand. According to the 2011 census it has a population of 291 living in 72 households. Its main agriculture product is ragi.

Climate
Giwaipani becomes very cold in the winters and remains moderate in summers, and is best enjoyed from March to October. Giwaipani gets snowfall in the winter season, mainly in the months of December, January and February.

Flora and fauna
The aseed, banjh, and deodar forests host an array of wildlife including show leopard, leopard cat, mountain goat, barking deer, sambhar, pine marten, Indian hare, red-faced monkey, jackal, langur, red fox, and porcupine.

Transport 
Giwaipani is situated at a distance of 352 km (approximately) from Delhi, well connected by road and railway. The nearest railway station is Ramnagar, approximately 70 km from  Giwaipani.  Pantnagar Airport is the nearest airport.  The nearest hill stations are Almora, Nainital, Ranikhet.

References

Villages in Almora district